Jezzeh (also Romanized as Jazeh) is a village in Khafr Rural District, Khafr District, Jahrom County, Fars Province, Iran. At the 2006 census, its population was 1,620, in 447 families.

References 

Populated places in  Jahrom County